The 1942–43 Idaho Vandals men's basketball team represented the University of Idaho during the 1942–43 NCAA college basketball season. Members of the Pacific Coast Conference, the Vandals were led by first-year acting head coach James "Babe" Brown and played their home games on campus at Memorial Gymnasium in Moscow, Idaho.

The Vandals were  overall but just  in conference play; the sole win came against Oregon State in

References

External links
Sports Reference – Idaho Vandals: 1942–43 basketball season
Gem of the Mountains: 1943 University of Idaho yearbook – 1942–43 basketball season
Idaho Argonaut – student newspaper – 1943 editions

Idaho Vandals men's basketball seasons
Idaho
Idaho
Idaho